Lee Tae-yang (Hangul: 이태양, Hanja: 李太陽; born July 3, 1990, in Yeosu, South Jeolla) is a South Korean right-handed starting pitcher who plays for the SSG Landers of the KBO League.

Lee won a gold medal with the South Korea national baseball team at the 2014 Asian Games.

On June 18, 2020, he moved through a 1:1 trade with Roh Soo-kwang, then a member of the SK Wyverns.

References

Hanwha Eagles players
KBO League pitchers
South Korean baseball players
People from Yeosu
1990 births
Living people
Asian Games gold medalists for South Korea
Asian Games medalists in baseball
Baseball players at the 2014 Asian Games
Medalists at the 2014 Asian Games
Sportspeople from South Jeolla Province